Alioto's Restaurant is a historic Italian fish restaurant located at San Francisco's Fisherman's Wharf. 

It began in 1925 as a fish stand, operated by Sicilian immigrant Nunzio Alioto, Sr. In 1932, with business at his Stall #8 doing well, Alioto built the first building on Fisherman’s Wharf and began selling crab and shrimp cocktails. After his death in 1933, his widow Rose Alioto and their children succeeded him, opening a full restaurant in 1938 and later expanding it into the adjacent building. The family claim that Rose Alioto was the originator of cioppino. The restaurant was destroyed by fire in 1957 but was reconstructed. King Harald and Queen Sonja of Norway dined there in 1995.

, Alioto's remained a family-run restaurant, with a great-grandson of the founder, Matthew Violante, as general manager. It closed in March 2020 during the COVID-19 pandemic and did not reopen. Its permanent closure was announced in April 2022.

References

External links

 Alioto's Restaurant, Legacy Business Program, San Francisco Office of Small Business

1925 establishments in California
Italian-American culture in San Francisco
Restaurants established in 1925
Restaurants in San Francisco
Sicilian-American cuisine
Italian restaurants in California